Alberto José Mejía Ferrero is a Colombian general. He served as General Commander of the Military Forces of Colombia.

References 

Living people
Year of birth missing (living people)
Place of birth missing (living people)
Colombian generals